Ante Pešić (born 27 August 1974) is a retired Croatian football player who was the bronze medalist in the 1999 Russian Top Division with PFC CSKA Moscow.

External links
 
 

1974 births
Living people
Association football defenders
Croatian footballers
HNK Šibenik players
PFC CSKA Moscow players
HNK Vukovar '91 players
Croatian Football League players
Russian Premier League players
Croatian expatriate footballers
Expatriate footballers in Russia
Croatian expatriate sportspeople in Russia